Sabac may mean:

 Šabac, a city in Serbia
 FK Mačva Šabac, football club
 Sabac Red, an American rap artist
 Sabbac, a supervillain character in DC Comics
 Sabacc, a card game similar to poker within the Star Wars canon